Josef Kadraba (29 September 1933 – 5 August 2019) was a Czech football player. He played for Czechoslovakia, playing 17 matches and scoring 9 goals.

He attended the 1962 FIFA World Cup, where Czechoslovakia won the silver medal. He scored one goal in the cup against Yugoslavia in the semi-final, which ended in a Czechoslovakian victory by 3-1.

He lived for many years in Vienna, Austria.

References

External links 

 
 Article at iDnes.cz

1933 births
2019 deaths
Czech footballers
Czechoslovak footballers
1962 FIFA World Cup players
Czechoslovakia international footballers
FC Slovan Liberec players
SK Slavia Prague players
AC Sparta Prague players
SK Kladno players
Association football forwards
People from Rakovník District
Sportspeople from the Central Bohemian Region